Otto Moldenhauer (30 August 1882 – 27 April 1969) was a German art director. He worked frequently on the director Gerhard Lamprecht's films.

Selected filmography
 Prince Cuckoo (1919)
 The Graveyard of the Living (1921)
 The Buddenbrooks (1923)
 And Yet Luck Came (1923)
 The Hanseatics (1925)
 People to Each Other (1926)
 Kubinke the Barber (1926)
 Sister Veronika (1927)
 The Catwalk (1927)
 The Old Fritz (1928)
 Under the Lantern (1928)
 The Strange Night of Helga Wangen (1928)
 Anastasia, the False Czar's Daughter (1928)
 The Man with the Frog (1929)
 Bobby, the Petrol Boy (1929)
 On the Reeperbahn at Half Past Midnight (1929)
 Different Morals (1931)
 Between Night and Dawn (1931)
 Ripening Youth (1933)
 The Two Seals (1934)
 His Late Excellency (1935)
 The Hour of Temptation (1936)
 A Strange Guest (1936)

References

Bibliography

External links 
 

1882 births
1969 deaths
German art directors
People from Potsdam